Relaxation stands quite generally for a release of tension, a return to equilibrium.

In the sciences, the term is used in the following ways:
 Relaxation (physics), and more in particular:
 Relaxation (NMR), processes by which nuclear magnetization returns to the equilibrium distribution
 Dielectric relaxation, the delay in the dielectric constant of a material
 Vibrational energy relaxation, the process by which molecules in high energy quantum states return to the Maxwell-Boltzmann distribution
 Chemical relaxation methods, related to temperature jump
 Relaxation oscillator, a type of electronic oscillator

In mathematics:
 Relaxation (approximation), a technique for transforming hard constraints into easier ones
 Relaxation (iterative method), a technique for the numerical solution of equations
 Relaxation (extension method), a technique for a natural extension in mathematical optimization or variational problems

In computer science:
 Relaxation (computing), the act of substituting alternative program code during linking

In physiology, hypnosis, meditation, recreation:
 Relaxation (psychology), the emotional state of low tension
 Relaxation technique, an activity that helps a person to relax
Relaxation can induced using breathing techniques. Long exhalation creates a relaxed pose. Making the temple of head and the upper lips relaxed helps keep a relaxed state. 

In ecclesiastical law:
 relaxation in person, transfer of a condemned person so that secular authorities execute a death sentence

See also
 Leisure
 Tension (music)
 Relaxation response (disambiguation)
 Relax (disambiguation)